Simhachalam bus station is a bus station located in temple town Simhachalam of the Indian state of Andhra Pradesh. It is owned by Andhra Pradesh State Road Transport Corporation. This is one of the major bus stations in the district, with services to Visakhapatnam, all towns and villages in the district.

References

Bus stations in Visakhapatnam
Year of establishment missing